USCA may refer to:
United States Cattlemen's Association
Ulster Special Constabulary Association
United States Canoe Association
Federal Republic of Central America, also known as the United Provinces of Central America and (inaccurately) the United States of Central America
United States Climate Alliance
United States Code Annotated
United States Court of Appeals
United States Croquet Association
United States Curling Association
University of South Carolina Aiken
University Students' Cooperative Association, a student housing cooperative in Berkeley, California, United States
USCA Foot, a Malagasy football club